Aditya Prakash may refer to:

 Aditya Prakash (badminton) (born 1990), Indian badminton player
 Aditya Prakash (architect) (1924–2008), Indian architect